Mark Catlin Jr. (October 18, 1910 – January 23, 1987) was a Wisconsin Republican politician and legislator.

Born in Appleton, Wisconsin, Catlin graduated from the University of Wisconsin–Madison and became a lawyer. His father was the college football coach Mark Catlin Sr., who was also a lawyer and legislator.

Catlin served in the Wisconsin State Assembly in 1937–1943, 1949–1951, and 1953–1957; Catlin also served as Speaker of the Assembly in the 1955 session and was a Republican.

In 1957, the State Bar of Wisconsin found Catlin guilty of unethical conduct; the ruling was upheld by the Wisconsin Supreme Court and he was fined $1500 and his law license was suspended for six months.

Notes

1910 births
1987 deaths
Politicians from Appleton, Wisconsin
University of Wisconsin–Madison alumni
Republican Party members of the Wisconsin State Assembly
Wisconsin lawyers
20th-century American politicians
Wisconsin politicians convicted of crimes
20th-century American lawyers